Thayar Thoppu is a village comes under Veerakeralampudur Panchayat, Veerakeralamputhur taluk, Tenkasi District Tamil Nadu, India. It locates between Alangulam and veerakeralampudur. Like any Indian rural village, this village too is steeped in tradition and rich in heritage, struggling to hold on to its past glories. Here the modern co-exist peacefully with the bullock-carts of yesterday years It's Panchayath union comes under Kilapavoor. It has one Government primary school.
Due to its location near Courtallam, the climatic condition is just awful and drizzles during Courtallam season.

Rivers 

The village is surrounded by two rivers Chittar River  and Hanumanathi. Both Hanumanathi and Chittar River merges rightly exactly in this village thus forming the major tributary to Thamirabarani River.

Chittar River

The Chittar meaning little river or Chitranathi meaning beautiful river is a nature's invaluable enna 
gift. It is the river which causes a set of splendid cascades in Courtalam and its suburbs, and international cynosure often compared to the famous Spa falls of Belgium for its curative value. It is a major tributary of the river Tamiraparani. It joins the river Tamiraparani near Sivalapperi village of Tirunelveli Taluk.

Hanumanathi

It is a tributary of the Chittar river. The anaicuts built across the river,  are Mettukal anaicut, Karisalkulam anaicut, Panpoli anaicut, Vallalkulam anaicut, Elathoor anaicut, Nainaragavan anaicut, Pungamkal anaicut and Kambli anaicut .

Religion 
Hinduism and Christianity  are the normal religion followed by the people here.
This village has two temples. A Narayana Swamy temple and Madasamy temple

Occupation of the people 
Agriculture is the main occupation. Most of the people work in farm fields and rolling Beedi. The main crops are paddy, onion, tomato, brinjal, tamarind, green chili, red chili, coconut, and snake guard.

Politics 
Thayar Thoppu comes under Tenkasi constituency for both Lok sabha and Assembly Elections.

Villages in Tirunelveli district